Christine Tremarco (born 1977) is a British television actress whose career began in 1992. She is best known for portraying the role of Davina Shackleton in the BBC One school-based drama series Waterloo Road (2007–2009) and also in BBC One medical drama series Casualty (2010-2013) as Linda Andrews.

Early life
Educated at St Cecilia's Catholic Infant and Junior Schools and then Holly Lodge Girls' College, Tremarco was spotted in a school play and invited to a new dance and drama school.  Then, when attending a drama group, an Australian casting agent offered her a leading role in The Leaving of Liverpool, a 1950s-based drama about the forced migration of children to Australia.

Career
Tremarco went on to star in two series of Springhill from 1996 to 1997 as Trish Freeman. In 2001, she appeared in Presence, by David Harrower, at the Royal Court Theatre.

Tremarco is perhaps most famous, however, for her role in the BBC One school-based drama series Waterloo Road as school secretary and learning support assistant Davina Shackleton, a role she portrayed regularly from 2007 to 2009. In her final episode, her character was last seen departing on a train to an unknown destination after an argument with her boyfriend Tom Clarkson (Jason Done). Her character suspected Tom of having an affair with Rose Kelly (Elaine Symons). She played Ellie Morgan in a BBC One drama mini-series Moving On, entitled Drowning Not Waving, which was broadcast in May 2009.

Tremarco guest starred in the BBC medical drama series Casualty in 2010 as Linda Andrews. Following a positive response to the character, she was reintroduced as a main character in 2011. Tremarco left the series in 2013.

In 2017, Tremarco appeared in Little Boy Blue as Marie Thompson, the mother of one of the gang members involved in assisting the cover up of Rhys Jones' murder, in 2007.

Filmography

References

External links

Living people
English television actresses
English child actresses
Actresses from Liverpool
British people of Sicilian descent
Date of birth missing (living people)
1977 births